HELP International Corporation Berhad (also known as HELP Group) is an investment holding company based in Kuala Lumpur, Malaysia. It was a public listed company on Bursa Malaysia. It was listed on 22 May 2007. It was delisted in January 2014.

HELP International Corporation and its subsidiaries is also known as the HELP Group.

Institutions
HELP University
HELP Academy
HELP International School
Crescendo - HELP International School
Tunku-Putra HELP International School

References

External links
Official website
Company Overview of Help International Corporation Bhd, bloomberg.com
HELP International Corporation Berhad (MYX: 7236), bursamalaysia.com

Companies formerly listed on Bursa Malaysia
2005 establishments in Malaysia
Companies established in 2005
Privately held companies of Malaysia